Esteban Leonardo Rolón (born 25 March 1995) is an Argentine professional footballer who plays as a central midfielder for Boca Juniors.

Club career

Argentinos Juniors
Born in Posadas, Misiones, Rolón joined Argentinos Juniors' youth setup in 2007 at the age of 12. He made his first team – and Primera División – debut on 4 March 2016, starting in a 1–5 home loss against Defensa y Justicia. He appeared in 11 matches during the season, as his side suffered relegation.

Rolón was an undisputed starter during the 2016–17 campaign, contributing with 40 appearances (39 as a starter) as his side returned to the main category at first attempt. He scored his first professional goal on 25 March 2017, netting his team's second in a 3–1 home win against San Martín de Tucumán.

Málaga
On 25 August 2017, Rolón signed a four-year contract with La Liga side Málaga CF. He was released on 3 October 2020, along with seven other first team players, due to a layoff.

Loan to Genoa
On 3 August 2018, Rolón joined to Italian Serie A club Genoa on loan until 30 June 2019.

Career statistics

Honours
Boca Juniors
Primera División: 2022
Copa Argentina: 2019–20
Copa de la Liga Profesional: 2022
Supercopa Argentina: 2022

References

External links

1995 births
Living people
Argentine people of Polish descent
People from Posadas, Misiones
Association football defenders
Argentine footballers
Argentine Primera División players
Primera Nacional players
La Liga players
Serie A players
Argentinos Juniors footballers
Málaga CF players
Genoa C.F.C. players
Argentine expatriate footballers
Argentine expatriate sportspeople in Spain
Expatriate footballers in Spain
Expatriate footballers in Italy
Sportspeople from Misiones Province